Caid may refer to:

 Qaid (also caid or kaid), various forms of responsible official found in places ranging from the Kingdom of Sicily to rural North Africa
 Caid (sport), a form of football popular in Ireland until the mid-19th century
 The Kingdom of Caid, a regional area of the Society for Creative Anachronism

CAID as an abbreviation may refer to:
 Computer-aided industrial design
 Contemporary Art Institute of Detroit
 Conditional Access Identification
 CAID (technology), a Chinese advertising technology for tracking users